Krut'aite or krutaite is a rare mineral with the formula CuSe2. It crystallises in the cubic crystal system. It is part of the pyrite group, being composed of Cu2+ ions and Se22− ions. The mineral is most often found as a dark grey aggregate consisting of tiny crystals no more than a millimeter in size. The crystals are opaque in any size. It has no industrial use, but it is a prized collector's item.

Etymology and history 
Krut'aite was first discovered in Petrovice in Okres Žďár nad Sázavou, Czech Republic and described in 1972 by Zdenek Johan, Paul Picot, Roland Pierrot and Milan Kvaček. It was named after the Czech mineralogist and director of the mineralogical laboratory of the Moravian museum, Tomáš Krut'a (1906–1998). Since Krut'a is officially spelled with a Ť, the mineral is written correctly as Krut'aite, according to the rules established by the IMA. In older publications, the apostrophe is omitted entirely.

Occurrence 
Krut'aite forms through hydrothermal processes and is often associated with clausthalite, eskebornite, berzelianite, uraninite, hematite, ferroselite, bukovite, umangite, chalcopyrite and goethite. It forms a solid solution series with trogtalite.

It was first identified in Petrovice, Okres Žďár nad Sázavou, Czech Republic, which is the only known locality in the Czech republic for the mineral, but it has since been identified in other places in the world.

Notable is the El Dragón Mine, Antonio Quijarro Province, Bolivia, where crystals up to a millimeter in size have been found. Other localities include:

Weintraube Mine, Lerbach, Rosenhof veins, Clausthal-Zellerfeld, Harz, Lower Saxony, Germany.

Tumiñico Mine, Sierra de Cacho, Villa Castelli, General La Madrid department, La Rioja, Argentina.

Yutangba Selenium deposit, Enshi Co., Enshi Tujia and Miao Autonomous Prefecture (E'xi Autonomous Prefecture), Hubei Province, China.

See also  
 List of minerals
 List of minerals named after people

References 

Selenide minerals
Copper(II) minerals